There are sixty-four Tīrthas (holy water bodies) in and around the island of Rameswaram, Tamil Nadu, India. According to Skānda Purāṇa, twenty-four of them are important. Bathing in these Tīrthas is a major aspect of the pilgrimage to Rameswaram and is considered equivalent to penance. Twenty-two of the Tīrthas are within the Rāmanāthasvāmī Temple.

List of Tīrthas

Notes

References 

 
 
 

Hinduism-related lists
Hindu pilgrimage sites in India
Rameswaram